James Cosgrave (born 16 March 1932) is an Australian former cricketer. He played three first-class cricket matches for Victoria between 1956 and 1957.

See also
 List of Victoria first-class cricketers

References

External links
 

1932 births
Living people
Australian cricketers
Victoria cricketers
Cricketers from Melbourne